Antigonaria is a genus of acoels. It is the only genus in the monotypic family Antigonariidae and is represented by a single species, Antigonaria arenaria.

References

Acoelomorphs
Monogeneric animal families